Mount Richardson is a  high mountain in the Waimakariri District and Canterbury region of New Zealand, north of Oxford. It has a hiking trail that leads to the peak. The Glentui River rises on its south-eastern slopes and the Ashley River / Rakahuri and its tributaries (of which the Glentui is one) drains the whole mountain.

Note and references 

Mountains of Canterbury, New Zealand